Lelkowo  is a village in Braniewo County, Warmian-Masurian Voivodeship, in northern Poland, close to the border with the Kaliningrad Oblast of Russia. It is the seat of the gmina (administrative district) called Gmina Lelkowo.

The village has a population of 1,080.

References

Villages in Braniewo County